Fifth Third Center is a 279 ft (85m) high rise in Tampa, Florida. It was completed in 1981 and has 19 floors. HKS, Inc. designed the building, which is the 21st tallest in Tampa. The name of the building was changed to Southtrust Building in June 2005. The building has an attached six story parking garage.

See also
List of tallest buildings in Tampa
 Downtown Tampa

References

Skyscraper office buildings in Tampa, Florida
1981 establishments in Florida
Office buildings completed in 1981
HKS, Inc. buildings